The Flag of Transvaal was the official flag of the Transvaal colony in South Africa from circa 1903 to 1910.  It formed part of a system of colonial flags that was used throughout the British Empire.  It was superseded by the flag of the Union of South Africa.

History
In a series of decisions made in 1864, 1865, and 1869, the British government decided that every colony should have a distinctive badge, to be displayed on flags at sea.  The governor was to display the badge in the centre of the Union Jack when travelling by sea;  vessels owned by the colony's government were to display it in the fly of the Blue Ensign;  and, with Admiralty permission, privately owned ships registered in the colony could display the badge in the fly of the Red Ensign.  This system is still in operation in the remaining British overseas territories.

A flag badge was duly approved for the Transvaal Colony (formerly the South African Republic), shortly after it had been annexed to the British Empire in 1902.  Although landlocked, the colony is believed to have used the defaced Blue Ensign on land.

Description
The badge was circular, and showed a lion lying down in the veld.  The lion was no doubt derived from the colony's new Public Seal, and it had also featured on the former South African Republic's coat of arms.

References

Sources
 Brownell, F.G. (1993).  National and Provincial Symbols.
 Burgers, A.P. (1997).  Sovereign Flags over Southern Africa.
 Burgers, A.P. (2008).  The South African Flag Book.
 Pama, C. (1965).  Lions and Virgins.
 Weekes, N. (2008).  Colonial Flag Badges : A Chronology.

See also
 List of South African flags
 Flag of the Cape Colony
 Flag of Goshen
 Flag of Natal
 Flag of the Natalia Republic
 Flag of the Nieuwe Republiek
 Flag of the Orange Free State
 Flag of the Orange River Colony
 Flag of South Africa
 Flag of the South African Republic
 Flag of Stellaland

Flags introduced in 1903
Flags of South Africa
South African heraldry
Blue Ensigns
Historical flags
Transvaal
Flags displaying animals